Pangodu is a rural village near Puthur in Kollam district of Kerala state.

It situated in the banks of the Kallada River. It is located on the Kottarakara-Karunagapaly route.

Economy
The economy is based upon agriculture. There are some brick factories and one cashew processing factory is working here.

Education
There is a very old high school, Kuzhikkalidavaka H.S. One Ayurveda Medical college is working here.

Important persons
Former Kerala Chief Minister Late Sri. R. Sankar was born in this village.

References

Villages in Kollam district